The Pac-12 Conference baseball tournament is the conference tournament in baseball for the Pac-12 Conference. It is a double-elimination tournament and seeding is based on Pac-12 regular season standings. The winner receives the conference's automatic bid to the NCAA Division I baseball tournament.

The Pac-12 was one of the few conferences to not host a conference tournament at the end of the regular season.  After several years of consideration, the tournament will begin in 2022.

Tournament
The Pac-12 Baseball tournament is a double-elimination tournament which in 2022 will be held at Scottsdale Stadium in Scottsdale, Arizona.  For the 2022 Tournament, eight of the 11 Pac-12 schools which field baseball teams qualify for the tournament. (Colorado does not field a team).  The winner earns the Pac-12's guaranteed bid to the NCAA Tournament.  

On October 20, 2022 the Pac-12 announced it would change the format by expanding the field to nine teams & switching to pool play.   There will be three teams in each pool, with each team playing two games in pool play.  Pool play will take place on Tuesday, Wednesday and Thursday, with three games per day.  Each pool will play a round-robin.  The three pool winners will advance to the Friday single-elimination semifinals along with one Wild Card team.  The Wild Card will be determined by the best record of the non-advancing teams.  Any tiebreaker will be awarded to the highest seeded team.  The semifinal matchups will be pit the highest seed team against the lowest seeded team on one side with the second highest seed and 2nd lowest seed on the other.  Teams from the same pool however will not play each other in the semifinals.

Pool A will include seeds #1, #6 and #9 with Pool B made up of seeds #2, #5, and #8.  Seeds #3, #4 and #7 will compete in Pool C.  With every team in the tournament guaranteed two games and teams advancing to Saturday's title game would play 4 games.

Champions

By school

References